Owensboro Catholic High School is a private, Roman Catholic high school in Owensboro, Kentucky, United States.  It is located in the Roman Catholic Diocese of Owensboro.

History
Owensboro Catholic opened in September 1951, replacing the closing St. Francis Academy.

Bus breakdown
In January 2016, a group of approximately 40 Owensboro Catholic students drew national attention after Winter Storm Jonas caused their bus to break down on Interstate 76 in western Pennsylvania. The students were returning from a school-sponsored trip to the March for Life in Washington, D.C. and were stranded in the bus for over twenty hours.

Controversy

In January 2019, a student from Owensboro Catholic High School was observed making comments at the Indigenous Peoples March in Washington, D.C. The student stated "land gets stolen all the time, it's how it works".  The President of Owensboro Catholic Schools, Tom Lilly stated that, "I know that they will use this as an opportunity to make this a teaching moment on the sensitivities involved. Any time there is any question about a time any kid makes a mistake, our goal is to correct them and teach them."

Academics
Owensboro Catholic High School issues three types of high school diplomas: the Standard High School Diploma, the College Preparatory Curriculum Diploma, and the Honors Curriculum Diploma. The Standard Diploma meets Kentucky state requirements for high school graduation. The College Preparatory Diploma and Honors Diploma meet the Pre-College Curriculum, a set of standards set by the Kentucky Department of Education for students planning on attending a four-year Kentucky public university.

Owensboro Catholic High School offers eight Advanced Placement (AP) courses. In July 2019, two of the school's faculty members, Cynda Wood and Bretnea Turner, attended the annual Advanced Placement Conference as presenters.

Athletics
Owensboro Catholic athletic teams are known as the Aces. The Aces basketball team shares the Owensboro Sportscenter with Kentucky Wesleyan College. , Owensboro Catholic has won 10 Kentucky High School Athletic Association championships:

 Baseball: 1985
 Fastpitch softball: 1998, 1999, 2003, 2005, 2009 (runners-up in 2001, 2004, 2006, 2013)
 Football: none (runners-up in 1997, 2004, 2005, 2010)
 Cross country (boys AA): 2001, 2005–2007
 Marching Aces (2021 1A state champions)

Notable alumni
 John Augenstein, golfer
 Florence Henderson actress and singer who played Carol Brady in The Brady Bunch 
 Chris Brown professional football defensive back
 Rebecca Greenwell basketball player
 Justin Marks professional baseball pitcher
 Nicky Hayden professional motorcycle racer

Notes and references

External links
 

Buildings and structures in Owensboro, Kentucky
Educational institutions established in 1951
Roman Catholic Diocese of Owensboro
Catholic secondary schools in Kentucky
Schools in Daviess County, Kentucky
1951 establishments in Kentucky